The 17th Empire Awards ceremony (officially known as the Jameson Empire Awards), presented by the British film magazine Empire, honoured the best films of 2011 and took place on 25 March 2012 at the Grosvenor House Hotel in London, England. During the ceremony, the Empire presented Empire Awards in 13 categories as well as three honorary awards. The awards for The Art of 3D, the new Best Male Newcomer and Best Female Newcomer (replacing the Best Newcomer award) and the honorary Empire Legend Award were first introduced this year. English Radio DJ Lauren Laverne and Empire magazine's news editor Chris Hewitt co-hosted the show, marking the first time for each and the first time the show was co-hosted. The awards were sponsored by Jameson Irish Whiskey for the fourth consecutive year.

In related events, Empire and Jameson Irish Whiskey held the 3rd Done In 60 Seconds Competition Global Final on March 23, 2012 at the London Film Museum, London, England. The team of judges consisted of Empire editor-in-chief Mark Dinning, Sky Movies Premiere English presenter Alex Zane, Irish actor and comedian Chris O'Dowd and English director Gareth Edwards, which selected from a shortlist of 28 nominees the five Done In 60 Seconds Award finalists that were invited to the Empire Awards where the winner was announced.

Tinker Tailor Soldier Spy won the most awards with three, including Best British Film. Other winners included Harry Potter and the Deathly Hallows – Part 2 and Thor with two awards and Kill List, Like Crazy, The Adventures of Tintin: The Secret of the Unicorn, The Inbetweeners Movie, and Tyrannosaur with one. Michael Fassbender received the Empire Hero Award, Ron Howard received the Empire Inspiration Award and Tim Burton received the Empire Legend Award. Indira Suleimenova from Kazakhstan won the Done In 60 Seconds Award for her 60-second film version of Black Swan.

Winners and nominees
Winners are listed first and highlighted in boldface.

Multiple awards
The following three films received multiple awards:

Multiple nominations
The following 13 films received multiple nominations:

Done In 60 Seconds films

References

External links
 
 

Empire Award ceremonies
2011 film awards
2012 in London
2012 in British cinema
March 2012 events in the United Kingdom
2010s in the City of Westminster